Detroiter could refer to:
A resident or native of Detroit, Michigan
the Detroiter (train), a passenger train operated by the New York Central Railroad
the Detroiter Abend - Post, a newspaper
a 1953 convertible car made by Detroit Accessories Co. in St. Clair Shores, Michigan
 Detroiter (ship, 1892), Detroit's first fireboat -- see Fireboats of Detroit, Michigan
a figure skating lift
 Stinson Detroiter